1st National Assembly may refer to:

 1st National Assembly at Epidaurus
 1st National Assembly of France
 1st National Assembly of Namibia
 1st National Assembly of Pakistan
 1st National Assembly of the Philippines
 1st National Assembly of Serbia